Raja Vikramarka is a 2021 Indian Telugu-language action spy thriller film written and directed by Sri Saripalli, starring Kartikeya, Tanya Ravichandran and P. Sai Kumar in the lead roles. Produced by Rama Reddy, the music of film was composed by Prashanth R Vihari as the music director. The film was released on 12 November 2021.

Plot 
An NIA agent, Raja Vikramarka 'Vikram' works under Mahendra. They catch a Nigerian agent who supplied arms to Guru Narayan's gang. He informs them that Guru Narayan bought the arms to kill the Home Minister Chakravarthy a Former sincere IPS Officer. Raja accidentally kills him before he reveals their entire plan. Mahendra sends Raja in a secret mission as an insurance policy agent under Muddu Krishna  a classical dancer turns insurance agent who teaches classical dance to Kanthi by hiding his identity to investigate the matter. Raja falls in love with the Chakravarthy's daughter, Kanthi. Although she initially turns down his advances, she likes him and eventually expresses her feelings for him.

Meanwhile ACP Govind who takes care of Chakravarthy's security finds Vikram's and Kanthi's relationship suddenly visits Vikram's home. There he finds out all his secret operation then no option left Vikram reveals his identity to Govind. Then Mahendra intervenes and convinces Govind to co-operate with them; then Vikram and Govind decide to work together for catching Guru Narayan.

As expected Guru Narayan attacks Chakravarthy in Muddu Krishna's meeting who became a manager by taking Chakravarthy's Life Insurance Policy which worths 10 crore. Vikram stops and arrests him. While everyone else feels relaxed, Vikram still doubts the Guru Narayan intentions behind his arrest. As Vikram anticipated, Guru Narayan's men kidnaps Kanthi at her Dance performance in front of Chakravarthy and demands him to be released.

A flashback episode reveals that Chakravarthy has enmity with Guru Narayan. When Chakravarthy was an IPS officer, he attacked and annihilated the gang of Guru Narayan who used to carry out contract killings under the disguise of Maoism. Chakravarthy shoots Guru Narayana who escapes but hospitalizes in comatose condition.

After 15 years waking up from coma, Guru Narayan wishes to destroy Chakravarthy's goodwill in public executed the current plan. Guru Narayan, who is now in jail, negotiates the release of Kanthi in exchange for his release. Then Vikram realises that Guru Narayan wants to kill Kanthi in front of Chakravarthy and escapes which makes him morally wounded and challenges the entire department.

Chakravarthy accompanies him along with Govind who wants to free his daughter without letting him escape. In an unfortunate turn of events, Chakravarthy gets killed in accidentally in the hands of Govind. An enraged Vikram chases and kills Guru Narayan who is trying to escape. Kanthi still remains with the kidnappers. On his deathbed Chakravarthy reveals that Kanthi told about him and he accepted there relationship, Vikram promises to save his daughter, then he advises Vikram to not leave anyone who involved in the conspiracy.

It is revealed that the Govind is the son of Guru Narayan and is the mastermind behind the kidnap. It is revealed that he wantedly kills Chakravarthy manages it as accident. Unknown of facts Vikram on his way to nab the criminals, meanwhile the enraged Govind attempts to kill Kanthi for killing his father and calls Vikram under disguise to kill Kanthi on hearing of him. While talking with Govind, Vikram finds out a minor clue who is a news channel regular tune. Then he wents to the office announces Rs 10 Crores the insurance amount of Chakravarthy in exchange for Kanthi to lure the kidnappers. While Govind doesn't bother about the money and wants to kill her, his gang convinces him to get the money.

After a Cat and Mouse game in a final confrontation, Raja recognizes Govind as Master mind and  saves Kanthi, arrests kidnappers, and kills Govind unofficially.

Cast 

 Kartikeya as Raja Vikramarka IPS 'Vikram', a NIA officer
 Tanya Ravichandran as Kanthi, Chakravarthy's daughter and Vikram's love interest 
 P. Sai Kumar as Home Minister Chakravarthy and Former IPS
 Tanikella Bharani as Mahendra IPS, Vikram's boss and Chakravathy's Former colleague.
 Harsha Vardhan as Muddu Krishna, an Insurance Agent and Kanthi's Classical dance teacher. 
 Sudhakar Komakula as ACP Govind Narayan, Guru Narayan's son who hides his identity and joins in Police department. 
 Pasupathy as Guru Narayan, a former Naxalite who vengeful against Chakravarthy.
 Surya
 Gemini Suresh
 Jabardhasth Naveen
 Naga Mahesh as Bhadram

Production 
The director Sri Saripalli, makes his debut through the film who earlier worked as an assistant director of Naayak (2013) Alludu Seenu  (2014) and Nuvvu Thopu Raa (2019). The film was announced in October 2019 and the principal photography was started in late 2019. The filming was resumed in February 2020 after being delayed due to COVID-19 pandemic in India and wrapped the entire shoot in August 2021. The title of the film was adapted from the 1990 film Raja Vikramarka, directed by Ravi Raja Pinisetty.

Soundtrack 

The soundtrack was composed by Prashanth R Vihari and was released by Saregama.

Reception

Critical reception 
Thadhagath Pathi of The Times of India gave a rating of 2/5 and cited the film as "dull and disappointing fare". He felt that "Raja Vikramarka was seen in the past, in the form of many films and the beats feel familiar. This one fails to engage." In contrast, Y Sunita Chowdhary of The Hindu felt that the film has a refreshing narrative. She further wrote that "the film is a good watch" and praised the writing department. Writing for The Indian Express, Gabbeta Ranjith Kumar criticized the story and screenplay. He also opined that "a  talent like Pasupathy, who entertained all with his acting prowess in Sarpatta Parambarai, is wasted here". Pinkvilla also criticized the story narration, screenplay and cited the film as "an inept action-comedy that is shorn of logic".

Box office 
On its opening day, the film has collected a gross collection of ₹1.25 crore.

References

External links 
 

2021 films
2020s Telugu-language films
2021 action thriller films
Indian action thriller films
Indian spy thriller films
2020s spy thriller films
Indian Army in films
Films shot in Hyderabad, India
Films set in Hyderabad, India
Film productions suspended due to the COVID-19 pandemic